John Patrick Edward Chandos Henniker-Major, 8th Baron Henniker  (19 February 1916 – 29 April 2004), known as Sir John Henniker-Major from 1965 to 1980, was a British peer, civil servant, and diplomat.

Early life and military service
Henniker was the eldest son of John Ernest de Grey Henniker-Major, 7th Baron Henniker, and Molly Burnet. He was educated at Stowe and Trinity College, Cambridge, where he gained a First in Modern Languages. He entered the Foreign Office in 1938, completing the entrance examinations at the top of his intake. He was appointed Third Secretary that year. Following the outbreak of the Second World War, Henniker was released for military service. He was commissioned as an officer into the Rifle Brigade, eventually rising to the rank of Major. During the war he served in the Western Desert campaign, being wounded in Libya and hospitalised in Cairo. In 1943 he joined Fitzroy Maclean's mission in Yugoslavia (Macmis) whilst on secondment to the Special Operations Executive and appointed as a British Liaison Officer (BLO) to Koča Popović, the most prominent Partisan commander.  In August 1944, the three men agreed the scope and tactics of the Operation Ratweek in central Serbia, which severely damaged German ambitions to withdraw troops from Greece and the southern Balkans.  In 1945 he was awarded the Military Cross.

Diplomatic and later career
After the war he returned to the diplomatic service and served at the British Embassy in Belgrade from 1945 to 1946, as Assistant Private Secretary to the Foreign Secretary Ernest Bevin from 1946 to 1948, at the Foreign Office from 1948 to 1950 and at the British Embassy in Buenos Aires from 1950 to 1952. From 1953 to 1960 he was Head of the Personnel Department at the Foreign Office.

In 1960 Henniker was appointed Ambassador to Jordan, a post he held until 1962, and was then Ambassador to Denmark from 1962 to 1966. He served as Assistant Under-Secretary of State from 1966 to 1967 but declined the ambassadorships to Brazil and the Republic of Ireland as he wanted to stay in England. In 1968 he became Director-General of the British Council, which he remained until 1972, before being invited to resign by Lord Fulton on the pretext of his wife's failing health. Henniker devoted the later part of his life to charitable causes, especially in Suffolk where his family had their ancestral seat. In 1980 he succeeded as eighth Baron Henniker on the death of his 97-year-old father and assumed his seat in the House of Lords. In the Lords, he briefly served as a spokesman for the Liberal Democrats. He was made a CMG in 1956, a CVO in 1960 and knighted a KCMG in 1965 New Year Honours.

Family
John Henniker-Major married Osla Benning in 1946. They had three children:
Mark Ian Philip Chandos Henniker-Major, 9th Baron Henniker (born 29 September 1947), married Lesley Antoinette Foskett
Hon. Charles John Giles Henniker-Major (2 September 1949 – 9 May 2012), married Sally Kemp Newby
Hon. Jane Elizabeth Henniker-Major (born 6 July 1954), married Richard Spring, Baron Risby

After his first wife's death in 1974 he married Julia Poland (née Mason) in 1976. He died in April 2004, aged 88, and was succeeded in his titles by his eldest son, Mark.

Arms

Notes

References
Kidd, Charles, Williamson, David (editors). Debrett's Peerage and Baronetage (1990 edition). New York: St Martin's Press, 1990, 

The Independent Obituary
Daily Telegraph Obituary

1916 births
2004 deaths
Barons in the Peerage of the United Kingdom
People educated at Stowe School
Alumni of Trinity College, Cambridge
Diplomatic peers
Rifle Brigade officers
British Army personnel of World War II
Knights Commander of the Order of St Michael and St George
Commanders of the Royal Victorian Order
Recipients of the Military Cross
Ambassadors of the United Kingdom to Denmark
Ambassadors of the United Kingdom to Jordan
People associated with the University of East Anglia
Eldest sons of British hereditary barons
Barons Henniker
Henniker